Peter Butler (born 3 October 1942) is an English former professional footballer who played as a goalkeeper.

Career
Born in Nottingham, Butler played for Notts County, Bradford City and Worksop Town.

References

1942 births
Living people
English footballers
Notts County F.C. players
Bradford City A.F.C. players
Worksop Town F.C. players
English Football League players
Association football goalkeepers